Wohlmuth is a German surname. Notable people with the surname include:

Barbara Wohlmuth (born 1967), German mathematician
Robert Wohlmuth (1902–1987), Austrian film director and screenwriter
Sharon Wohlmuth (1946–2022), American photojournalist

German-language surnames